The Union of Russian Writers is a non-governmental organization uniting Russian and writers (novelists, poets, essayists, etc.). It was established in 1991, when on the basis of USSR Union of Writers three independent associations were formed: the Writers' Union of Russia (the "patriotic" orientation), the Writers' Union of Moscow, and the Union of Russian Writers ("democratic" union). The Union of Russian Writers includes more than 3,500 writers from Russia and former USSR, in 58 regional organizations.

Upon the 2022 Russian invasion of Ukraine, the Union of Russian Writers published a statement voicing  its full support for Russian President Vladimir Putin, the federal security and the army, and denouncing some intellectual and cultural figures who had spoken out against the invasion.

References

External links
  

1991 establishments in the Soviet Union
Organizations established in 1991
Russian writers' organizations